Leptocypris weynsii is a species of cyprinid fish found in the lower, central and upper Congo River basin and Pool Malebo in the Democratic Republic of Congo and the Central African Republic.

References

Leptocypris
Danios
Fish of Africa
Fish described in 1899